Wrestle Kingdom 15 in Tokyo Dome was a professional wrestling pay-per-view (PPV) event produced by New Japan Pro-Wrestling (NJPW). The event took place over two nights, on January 4 and 5, 2021 at the Tokyo Dome in Tokyo, Japan. It was the 30th January 4 Tokyo Dome Show and the 15th promoted under the Wrestle Kingdom name.

Production

Background
The January 4 Tokyo Dome Show is NJPW's biggest annual event and has been called "the largest professional wrestling show in the world outside of the United States" and the "Japanese equivalent to the Super Bowl". The show has been promoted under the Wrestle Kingdom name since 2007. 

NJPW announced Wrestle Kingdom 15 for January 4 and 5, 2021 on October 18, 2020, during the G1 Climax 30 finals. This marked the second time that Wrestle Kingdom took place over two nights.

Due to the COVID-19 pandemic, Wrestle Kingdom 15 originally had a limited attendance capacity of 20,000 for both nights. On December 29, NJPW stopped ticket sales due to tighter restrictions on large-scale events in Tokyo.

On December 20, NJPW's sister promotion World Wonder Ring Stardom announced that they would host a match on the January 5 event.

Storylines
On October 18, 2020, Kota Ibushi won the G1 Climax 30 by defeating Sanada in the finals, entitling him to a match for both the IWGP Heavyweight Championship and IWGP Intercontinental Championship at Wrestle Kingdom 15. Ibushi unsuccessfully defended his Right to Challenge contract at Power Struggle on November 7, losing the contract to Jay White. On November 8, Naito announced that he would defend the titles against both Ibushi and White on the two nights, Ibushi on night 1 and White on night 2.

On October 16, 2020, Will Ospreay defeated Kazuchika Okada in their A Block G1 Climax match, after interference from Bea Priestley and the returning young lion Tomoyuki Oka who was on an excursion at Revolution Pro Wrestling, performing under the ring name Great-O-Khan. After the match Ospreay turned heel when he attacked Okada; in the post-match interview Ospreay announced he left Chaos and formed a new stable, later called The Empire. At Power Struggle, Okada defeated Great-O-Khan; after the match, Ospreay challenged Okada to a match at Wrestle Kingdom 15 which Okada accepted.

On December 11, Hiromu Takahashi defeated El Desperado to win the Best of the Super Juniors tournament; after the match, Takahashi said he wanted to face the Super J-Cup winner before facing the IWGP Junior Heavyweight Champion. On December 12, El Phantasmo won the Super J-Cup by defeating A. C. H. and accepted Takahashi's challenge. NJPW announced that Takahashi and El Phantasmo would face each other on night 1 at Wrestle Kingdom 15 with the winner facing Taiji Ishimori on night 2 for the IWGP Junior Heavyweight Championship.

On August 21, 2020, Kenta defeated David Finlay to win the New Japan Cup USA tournament, which entitled him to a match for the IWGP United States Championship. During Road to Tokyo Dome on December 22, Juice Robinson challenged Kenta to a match for Kenta's Right to Challenge contract at Wrestle Kingdom. However, Robinson would suffer an injury to his orbital bone, and NJPW subsequently named Satoshi Kojima as Robinson's replacement.

Results

See also

2022 in professional wrestling
Professional wrestling at the Tokyo Dome
List of NJPW pay-per-view events

References

2021 in professional wrestling
2021 in Tokyo
January 2021 events in Japan
January 4 Tokyo Dome Show
Events in Tokyo